William Kaleviano (May 27, 1916 – December 17, 1980) was an American television actor. Born in New Hampshire. Kendis appeared in the private detective television series Michael Shayne, playing Emmett Hughes. He guest-starred in television programs, including an appearance as murder victim Walter Prescott in the legal drama television series Perry Mason episode, "The Case of the Lame Canary", with also playing Carey Post in the western television series Gunsmoke episode "Joe Phy". He also guest-starred in television programs including The Rifleman, The Adventures of Rin Tin Tin, Bewitched, The Detectives, 77 Sunset Strip, Bachelor Father, Family Affair, The Flying Nun, Leave it to Beaver and Peter Gunn. One of his known appearances included as Olmstead in the American anthology television series The Twilight Zone in the episode "Will the Real Martian Please Stand Up?".

Kendis died in December 1980 in Los Angeles, California, at the age of 64.

References

External links 

Rotten Tomatoes profile

1916 births
1980 deaths
People from New Hampshire
Male actors from New Hampshire
American male television actors
20th-century American male actors